Donald Arthur Triner (21 August 1919 – 2002) was an English footballer who played for Port Vale either side of World War II.

Career
Triner played for Downing's Tileries before joining Port Vale in December 1938. Before turning professional he was employed as a joiner in Hanley. In only his second game, a 1–0 home win at Bristol Rovers on 7 January 1939, he broke his leg. He managed to make guest appearances for Stafford Rangers from January to April 1940 before returning to guest for the Port Vale "A" team (the first team were in abeyance due to the war). He was conscripted in 1941 and guested for Morecambe when he was stationed in the area. He was demobbed in the spring of 1946 and with the threat of Nazism vanquished he returned to The Old Recreation Ground, breaking into the first team by December that year. He scored seven goals in 22 games in 1946–47. However, he once again broke his leg in May 1947, and failed to win back his place upon his recovery. He was released at the end of the 1947–48 season, at which point he moved on to Witton Albion. He scored six goals in twenty games in the 1948–49 Cheshire County League title winning season and featured seven times in the 1949–50 campaign. He later played for Buxton, Biggleswade Town (released in May 1953 having "failed to come anywhere near to expectation") and Leek Town.

Career statistics
Source:

Honours
Witton Albion
Cheshire County League: 1948–49

References

Footballers from Stoke-on-Trent
English footballers
Association football midfielders
Port Vale F.C. players
Stafford Rangers F.C. wartime guest players
Morecambe F.C. wartime guest players
British Army personnel of World War II
Witton Albion F.C. players
Buxton F.C. players
Biggleswade Town F.C. players
Leek Town F.C. players
English Football League players
1919 births
2002 deaths